This is a list of Bengali language television channels in India.

Government-Owned Channel

General Entertainment

Defunct Channels

News

Defunct Channels

Movies

Music

Kids

Audio Feeds

Infotainment & Lifestyle

Audio Feeds

Sports

Defunct Channel

HD Channels

General Entertainment

Movies

See also
List of 4K channels in India
List of HD channels in India

Lists of television channels by language
Television channels in India
Lists of television channels in India
Indian television-related lists
Bengali television-related lists